The 2012–13 Bulgarian Cup was the 31st official season of the Bulgarian annual football knockout tournament. The competition began on 13 October 2012 with the matches of the preliminary round and ended with the final on 15 May 2013. Ludogorets Razgrad were the defending champions, but were eliminated by CSKA Sofia in the second round. Beroe Stara Zagora won the title, their second overall, after defeating Levski Sofia in the final by penalties.

The winners of the competition, Beroe Stara Zagora, qualified for the second qualifying round of the 2013–14 UEFA Europa League.

Participating clubs
The following teams competed in the cup:

First round 
The draw was conducted on 2 October 2012. The matches were played on 13 October 2012. On this stage the participants will be the 14 teams from the B PFG (second division) and the 8 winners from the regional amateur competitions. The team from the lower league has home advantage. Ten teams received a bye for the next round.

Note: Roman numerals in brackets denote the league tier the clubs participate in during the 2012–13 season.

|-
|colspan="3" style="background-color:#99CCCC" align="center"|10 October 2012

|-
|colspan="3" style="background-color:#99CCCC" align="center"|13 October 2012

|}

Second round 
The draw was conducted on 18 October 2012. The first legs will be played on 30 October and 1 November 2012, the second legs are on 24 and 25 November 2012. On this stage the participants will be the 6 winners from the first round, the 10 teams, which receiveda bye and the 16 teams from A PFG (first division).

Summary 
Note: Roman numerals in brackets denote the league tier the clubs participate in during the 2012–13 season.

|}

First legs

Second legs

Third round 
The draw was conducted on 26 November 2012. The first legs will be played on 2 and 3 December 2012, the second legs are on 15 and 16 December 2012. On this stage the participants will be the 16 winners from the second round.

Summary 
Note: Roman numerals in brackets denote the league tier the clubs participate in during the 2012–13 season.

|}

First legs

Second legs

Quarter-finals 
The draw was conducted on 18 December 2012. On this stage the participants will be the 8 winners from the third round.

Summary 
Note: Roman numerals in brackets denote the league tier the clubs participate in during the 2012–13 season.

|}

First legs

Second legs

Semi-finals 
The matches were played on 17 and 24 April 2013. At this stage the participants will be the four winners from the quarter-finals. The team from the lower league has home advantage.

Summary 
Note: Roman numerals in brackets denote the league tier the clubs participated in during the 2012–13 season.

|}

First legs

Second legs

Final

See also
 2012–13 A Group
 2012–13 B Group
 2012–13 V AFG

References

Bulgarian Cup seasons
Bulgarian Cup
Cup